Lesley J. Gordon is an American military historian specializing in the American Civil War. She holds the Charles G. Summersell Chair of Southern History at the University of Alabama.

Education and career 
Gordon attended East Granby High School in East Granby, Connecticut. She studied history at the College of William & Mary and obtained her PhD from the University of Georgia. She succeeded George C. Rable as the Charles G. Summersell Professor of Southern History at Alabama in 2016, having previously held positions at Murray State University and the University of Akron.

Work on the American Civil War 
Gordon's research focuses on the American Civil War. Her first book, published in 1998, was a biography of the Confederate general George E. Pickett, famed for his failed charge at the Battle of Gettysburg. Gordon argued that Pickett's posthumous reputation as tragic hero of the Lost Cause was largely the creation of his wife, LaSalle Pickett, who made a living giving talks about her deceased husband on the lecture circuit for more than fifty years after his death, and that his actual achievements were more modest. The book was described as "well-written and exhaustively researched", and praised for bringing attention to the actions of women in the period.

Her other books include This Terrible War (2003), a textbook on the Civil War co-authored with Daniel E. Sutherland and Michael Fellman, currently in its third edition, and A Broken Regiment (2014), a regimental history of the 16th Connecticut Infantry Regiment. She has also edited and contributed to a number of edited volumes, and was formerly the editor of the journal Civil War History.

In 2017, Gordon appeared on the American version of the genealogy documentary series Who Do You Think You Are?; she revealed to actor Noah Wyle that one of his ancestors fought in the Confederate Army.

Selected publications

References 

Year of birth missing (living people)
Living people
American military historians
American women historians
College of William & Mary alumni
Historians of the American Civil War
University of Alabama faculty
University of Georgia alumni